Shelly Duncan is an American politician and a Republican former member of the Wyoming House of Representatives representing District 5 from January 8, 2019 until January 10, 2023.

Elections

2018
When incumbent Republican Representative Cheri Steinmetz retired to run for the State Senate seat held by Curt Meier, Duncan announced her candidacy. Duncan won the Republican primary with 42.3% of the vote, and defeated Democratic candidate Joan Brinkley with 76.7% of the vote.

2020
Duncan was unopposed in the August 18, 2020 Republican Primary, winning with 1,917 votes.  Duncan was  unopposed for the November 3, 2020 General Election and won with 4,122 votes.

References

External links
Official page at the Wyoming Legislature
Profile from Ballotpedia

Living people
Republican Party members of the Wyoming House of Representatives
People from Lingle, Wyoming
21st-century American politicians
Year of birth missing (living people)
21st-century American women politicians
Women state legislators in Wyoming